Robert Solomon Wistrich (April 7, 1945 – May 19, 2015) was the Erich Neuberger Professor of European and Jewish history at the Hebrew University of Jerusalem, and the head of the University's Vidal Sassoon International Center for the Study of Antisemitism. Wistrich considered antisemitism "the longest hatred" and viewed Anti-Zionism as its latest incarnation. According to Scott Ury, "More than any other scholar, Wistrich has helped integrate traditional Zionist interpretations of Jewish history, society, and fate into the study of antisemitism." Other researchers have reproduced much of his work without questioning its founding assumptions.

Biography
Robert Wistrich was born in Lenger, in the Kazakh Soviet Socialist Republic on April 7, 1945. 
His parents were leftist Polish Jews who had moved to Lviv in 1940 in order to escape the Germans; however, they found Soviet totalitarianism to be little better. In 1942 they moved to Kazakhstan, where Wistrich's father was imprisoned twice by the NKVD. His parents returned to Poland under a repatriation agreement between Stalin and the Polish government-in-exile.

Later, finding the post-war environment in Poland to be dangerously anti-Semitic, the family moved to France. The author grew up in England, and went to Kilburn Grammar School, where he was taught by "Walter Isaacson, a refugee from Nazi Germany who first taught me how to think independently"

In December 1962, aged 17, Wistrich won an Open Scholarship to study History at Queens' College, Cambridge. In 1966 he graduated with a BA (Hons) from the University of Cambridge, which was raised to a MA degree in 1969. At Cambridge, he founded Circuit, a literary and arts magazine that he co-edited between 1966 and 1969. Between 1969–1970, during a study year in Israel, he became the youngest ever literary editor of New Outlook, a left-wing monthly in Tel Aviv, founded by Martin Buber.

Academic career

Wistrich received his Ph.D. from the University of London in 1974.  Between 1974 and 1980, he was Director of Research at the Institute of Contemporary History and the Wiener Library (at that time the largest research library on the Third Reich existing in Europe) and the editor of the Wiener Library Bulletin in London. Appointed a Research Fellow at the British Academy, he had already written several well-received books by the time he was given tenure at the Hebrew University of Jerusalem in 1982. In 1985 his book Socialism and the Jews won the joint award of the Vidal Sassoon International Center for the Study of Antisemitism at the Hebrew University of Jerusalem and the American Jewish Committee. His 1989 book The Jews of Vienna in the Age of Franz Joseph received the Austrian State Prize in History. His next study, Antisemitism: The Longest Hatred (1991) won the Jewish Quarterly-Wingate Literary Prize in the UK a year later, and was the basis for The Longest Hatred — a three-hour British-American TV documentary mini-series made for  Thames Television/WGBH scripted by Wistrich and shown on PBS. In 1993, he also scripted Good Morning, Mr. Hitler, an award-winning documentary on Nazi art commissioned by the UK's Channel 4.

Between 1991 and 1995, Wistrich was appointed the first holder of the Chair of Jewish Studies at University College London, in addition to his position at the Hebrew University of Jerusalem. He also wrote several dramas for BBC radio and Kol Israel on the lives of historical figures ranging from Leon Trotsky to Theodor Herzl. In 2003, he acted as the chief historical consultant for the BBC documentary, Blaming the Jews (about contemporary Muslim antisemitism) and in 2006 he was the academic advisor for the film: Obsession: Radical Islam's War Against the West.

He was one of six scholars who sat on the International Catholic-Jewish Historical Commission from 1999 to 2001 to examine the wartime record of Pope Pius XII, with special reference to The Holocaust. From 2002, he was the director of the Vidal Sassoon International Center for the Study of Antisemitism, and edited its journal, Antisemitism International.

Death
Wistrich died of a heart attack on May 19, 2015 in Rome, Italy.

Published works

Selected books

Revolutionary Jews from Marx to Trotsky. Barnes & Noble Books, 1976. 
The Left Against Zion. Vallentine Mitchell & Co, 1979. 
Who's Who in Nazi Germany. Weidenfeld and Nicolson, London, 1982. 
Socialism and the Jews. Oxford University Press, 1982.

The Jews of Vienna in the Age of Franz Joseph. Oxford University Press, 1989.
Between Redemption and Perdition: Modern Antisemitism and Jewish Identity. Routledge, 1990. 
Anti-Zionism and Antisemitism in the Contemporary World. New York University Press, 1990. 
Antisemitism, the Longest Hatred. Pantheon, 1992.
Terms of Survival. Routledge, 1995. 
Weekend in Munich: Art, Propaganda and Terror in the Third Reich (with Luke Holland). Trafalgar Square, 1996. 
Theodor Herzl: Visionary of the Jewish State. New York and Jerusalem: Herzl Press and Magnes Press, 1999, 390 pages.
Demonizing the Other: Antisemitism, Racism and Xenophobia. Routledge, 1999. 
Hitler and the Holocaust. Random House, 2001.
Nietzsche: Godfather of Fascism? Princeton, 2002.
Laboratory for World Destruction. Germans and Jews in Central Europe, University of Nebraska Press, Lincoln, Nebraska 2007. 
A Lethal Obsession: Antisemitism – From Antiquity to the Global Jihad, Random House, 2010. 
From Ambivalence to Betrayal. The Left, the Jews and Israel, University of Nebraska Press, Lincoln, Nebraska 2012.

References

Further reading

Michael Berkowitz "Robert S. Wistrich and European Jewish History: Straddling the Public and Scholarly Spheres" in: The Journal of Modern History 70 (March 1998) 119-136.
Scott Ury "Strange Bedfellows? Anti-Semitism, Zionism, and the Fate of 'the Jews'” American Historical Review 123, 4 (Oct. 2018) 1151-1171.
“From Cracow to London; A Polish Jewish Odyssey” in: The Jews in Poland. Volume 2, Slawomir Kapralski ed., Cracow 1999 (Judaica Foundation Center for Jewish Culture), pp. 57–73.
“The Vatican and the Shoah”, Modern Judaism, Vol. 21, Nr. 2, May 2001, pp. 83–107
“The Demise of the Catholic-Jewish Historical Commission”, Midstream, December 2001, pp. 2–5.
“The Vatican on Trial”, The Jerusalem Report, 28. January 2002, pp. 4–6.,
Gerstenfeld, Manfred. "Something rotten in the State of Europe: Anti-Semitism as a Civilizational Pathology", an interview with Robert Wistrich, Jerusalem Center for Public Affairs, October 1, 2004.
"Viewpoints: Anti-Semitism and Europe", includes comment from Robert Wistrich, BBC, December 3, 2003.
Claremont Review on Wistrich and "A Lethal Obsession" Summer 2011.
“Antisemitism – A Civilizational Pathology”, in Manfred Gerstenfeld (ed.) Israel and Europe: An Expanding Abyss (Jerusalem 2005), pp. 95–110.
“Cruel Britannia” Azure (Summer 2005), pp. 100–124.
“Drawing the Line. On Antisemitism and anti-Zionism”, The Jewish Quarterly Nr. 198 (Summer 2005), pp. 21–24.
“How to Tackle the New Antisemitism” in Standpoint (October 2008) pp. 74–77.
"Interviews”, in Andrei Marga (ed.), Dialoguri (Presa Universitarǎ Clujeanǎ, 2008), pp. 221–235. In English

External links

Robert Wistrich's website

1945 births
2015 deaths
Alumni of Queens' College, Cambridge
Kazakhstani Jews
English people of Polish-Jewish descent
English Jews
Jewish historians
Scholars of antisemitism